Guzew may refer to the following places:
Guzew, Łódź Voivodeship (central Poland)
Guzew, Mińsk County in Masovian Voivodeship (east-central Poland)
Guzew, Płock County in Masovian Voivodeship (east-central Poland)